The following units and commanders fought at the Battle of Guilford Court House on March 15, 1781.

Abbreviations used

Military rank
 LTG = Lieutenant General
 MG  = Major General
 BG  = Brigadier General
 Col = Colonel
 Ltc = Lieutenant Colonel
 Maj = Major
 Cpt = Captain

Other
 (w) = wounded
 (mw) = mortally wounded
 (k) = killed in action

British forces
LTG Charles, Earl Cornwallis
MG Alexander Leslie, second in command

American forces
MG Nathanael Greene
BG Isaac Huger, second in command (w)

Notes

American Revolutionary War orders of battle